Leslie Gordon Kittle (26 February 1894 – 28 March 1965) was a former Australian rules footballer who played with Carlton and Essendon in the Victorian Football League (VFL).

Notes

External links 

Les Kittle's profile at Blueseum

1894 births
Australian rules footballers from Victoria (Australia)
Carlton Football Club players
Essendon Football Club players
1965 deaths